Cherkaske is an urban-type settlement in Novomoskovsk Raion of Dnipropetrovsk Oblast (province) of eastern Ukraine. It hosts the administration of Cherkaske settlement hromada, one of the hromadas of Ukraine. Population: .

It is home to 93rd Mechanized Brigade of Ukrainian Ground Forces. Cherkaske is located in close proximity to another military town, Hvardiiske.

During the Cold War, the 22nd Guards Tank Division was based in Cherkaske. The settlement originated in 1949 as the military town of Nove, where a training battalion was originally stationed, and was renamed in 1957 after the Cherkassy honorific title of the 22nd Guards Tank Division.

References

Notes

Sources
 City Council

Urban-type settlements in Novomoskovsk Raion